The South Australian Railways 710 class was a class of 2-8-2 steam locomotives operated by the South Australian Railways.

History
The 710 class were built by the Islington Railway Workshops as a modified version of the Armstrong Whitworth built 700 class locomotives. Coal shortages after World War II saw a number converted to burn oil. All were later converted back to coal burners. The first two were withdrawn in July 1961 with the remainder replaced as 830 diesel locomotives entered service. The last was withdrawn in September 1967.

References

External links

Railway locomotives introduced in 1928
710
2-8-2 locomotives
Broad gauge locomotives in Australia
Freight locomotives